This article presents official statistics gathered during the COVID-19 pandemic in Bangladesh. 

The numbers are sourced from the official daily press releases, originally released by the Institute of Epidemiology, Disease Control and Research (IEDCR) and later from the Directorate General of Health Services (DGHS).

Charts

Daily tests, cases, and deaths

Daily cases

Daily deaths

Daily recoveries 

Note: On 15 June, the total number of people who were recorded to have recovered from the coronavirus disease rose by over 15,000. The Directorate General of Health Services (DGHS) started to announce how many people recovered at hospital and home on this date.

Daily positivity rates 
The daily positivity rate is the percentage of tests conducted on a given day which returned a positive diagnosis.

Case fatality rate 
The trend of case fatality rate for COVID-19 from 8 March, the day first case in the country was recorded.

Total cases, deaths and recoveries

Total cases, deaths and recoveries (log)

Tables

Table: Daily updates

Table: Confirmed cases per district

References

External links 
 

COVID-19 pandemic in Bangladesh
Disease outbreaks in Bangladesh
Bangladesh